The 2015–16 season was Hapoel Nazareth Illit's 53rd football season since its establishment, and the seventh consecutive season in Liga Leumit. 

During the season the club struggled in the bottom of Liga Leumit, spending many weeks at bottom place. However, a resurgence inspired by a manager change lifted the club to a 13th-place finish, 8 points above the relegation zone.

Matches

League

Regular season

Relegation group

State Cup

League Cup

Hapoel Nazareth Illit finished fourth and was eliminated.

Player details
List of squad players, including number of appearances by competition

Transfers

In:

Out:

References

External links
 2015–16 Hapoel Nazareth Illit Season at IFA

Hapoel Nof HaGalil F.C. seasons
Hapoel Nazareth Illit F.C.